= Urisee =

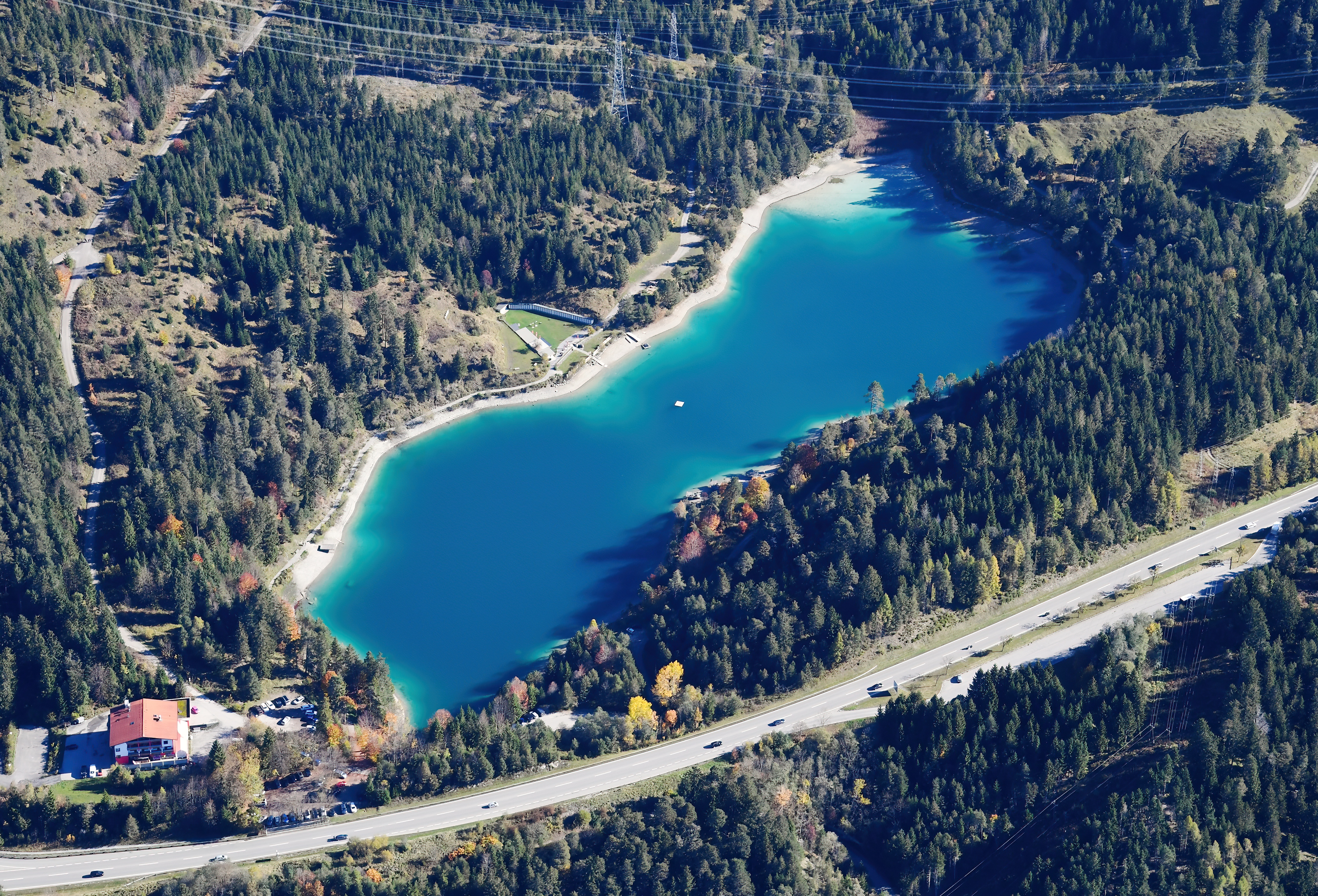

- Location within Austria
- Location: Tyrol, Austria
- Coordinates: 47°30′N 10°44′E
- Type: lake

Urisee is a lake of Tyrol, Austria.
